Laleh Eftekhari is an Iranian conservative politician and former member of the Parliament of Iran representing Tehran, Rey, Shemiranat and Eslamshahr.

References
 Biography

1959 births
Living people
Members of the 7th Islamic Consultative Assembly
Members of the 8th Islamic Consultative Assembly
Members of the 9th Islamic Consultative Assembly
Deputies of Tehran, Rey, Shemiranat and Eslamshahr
Alliance of Builders of Islamic Iran politicians
Islamic Coalition Party politicians
Zeynab Society politicians
Ferdowsi University of Mashad alumni
University of Tehran alumni
Members of the Women's fraction of Islamic Consultative Assembly
Islamic Society of Athletes politicians
Popular Front of Islamic Revolution Forces politicians
21st-century Iranian women politicians
21st-century Iranian politicians